Ticao can refer to:

 Ticao Island, Masbate province, Philippines
 Ticao Pass, the strait that separates Ticao Island from the Bicol Peninsula in the Philippines
 Carlos Augusto Bertoldi, known as Ticão, a Brazilian footballer